Michiel van Kampen (born January 23, 1976, Haarlem) is a Dutch baseball player who currently plays for Kinheim and the Dutch national team. He has been a star relief pitcher in the Hoofdklasse who once set the appearances record and was MVP of the 2007 Holland Series. His sister Judith van Kampen is a star softball pitcher for the Dutch women's softball national team and was the first Dutch woman to play NCAA Division I softball, for the University of Nevada; they both will play for the Netherlands in the 2008 Summer Olympics in Beijing.

Van Kampen pitched in the US for four years, for Treasure Valley Community College and Albertson College. In 2000, he was 4-1 with 2 saves and a 2.96 ERA for Albertson. In 1999, he had helped Albertson finish second in the NAIA College World Series. In the 1999 European Championship, van Kampen threw two scoreless innings, striking out five batters. He was the top pitcher on the Dutch national team in the 2001 Baseball World Cup, allowing no runs in  IP, the only pitcher on the team not to be scored upon. He had a 1.13 ERA in the 2001 World Port Tournament. That year, Van Kampen appeared in 33 games in the Hoofdklasse, setting a league record. In the 2001 European Championship, van Kampen retired all five batters he faced as the Netherlands won Gold.

His 14 saves led the Hoofdklasse in 2002, doubling runner-up Richard Beljaards. Van Kampen had four saves for HCAW in the Hoofdklasse in 2003. He had a 9.00 ERA and one save in the 2003 World Port Tournament, allowing five hits in two innings of work. He only pitched once in the 2003 Baseball World Cup, tossing a scoreless inning and allowing one hit in an easy win and combined 2-hitter over the French national team. He would not appear for the Dutch national team in the 2004 Summer Olympics in Athens.

Van Kampen saved 7 games for HCAW in 2004, third in the Hoofdklasse. In 2005, he moved to Instant Holland A90 and was 1-2 with 6 saves (4th in Hoofdklasse) and a 1.05 ERA in 26 outings. He was back with the Dutch squad for the 2005 European Championship (hurling two games as the Netherlands won the Gold). He had a 1.93 ERA in four appearances in the 2005 Baseball World Cup as the Dutch team finished 4th, their highest ever to that point. 2006 was a busy year for Van Kampen. He pitched in the 2006 World Baseball Classic as the lone Dutch pitcher to succeed in an 11-2 loss to the Cuban national team. He relieved Calvin Maduro in the 7th with a 10-2 deficit. He struck out 3 batters in 1 IP, allowing no runs. He began by whiffing Yoandy Garlobo and Carlos Tabares. In the 8th, he retired Eduardo Paret on a grounder. He then plunked Michel Enriquez and Yulieski Gourriel reached on a fielder's choice. Van Kampen fanned Joan Carlos Pedroso before giving way to relief pitcher Nick Stuifbergen.

In the regular Hoofdklasse season (now with Corendon Kinheim), Van Kampen was 1-2 with 11 saves and a 2.30 ERA. He led the league in saves. He was 1-0 with a save and 0.00 ERA in three playoff appearances. He had a save and 1.42 ERA in the 2006 Holland Series, which Kinheim won. Van Kampen threw nine scoreless innings in the 2006 Intercontinental Cup to help the Netherlands win the silver medal. He was 1-0 with a save in the competition. He threw 2 scoreless frames in a 4-3 win over former champion Australia, got the win in the 4-2 victory over the Chinese Taipei national team and tossed the final three innings in a shutout over the Japanese national team in the semifinals for the save.

In the 2006 Haarlem Baseball Week, Van Kampen was 1-0 with a 3.18 ERA for the champion Dutch squad. In 2007, he went 2-0 with 8 saves and a 1.05 ERA for Kinheim and only walked three batters in 25 IP. He tied Dave Draijer for the save lead in the circuit and tied Draijer for second in games pitched (23), one behind Stephen Spragg. He struck out 8 batters in four innings in the playoffs, saving two and posting a 2.25 ERA. In the 2007 Holland Series, Van Kampen pitched 5 innings, allowing no runs. He saved two of the games in the 3-game sweep by Kinheim and won the other contest. Van Kampen pitched 3 scoreless innings for Kinheim in the 2007 European Cup, registering a save in the finals. It was the first European Cup title for Kinheim.

In the 2007 European Championship, van Kampen threw 3 scoreless innings, saving one game as the Netherlands won the Gold and qualified for the 2008 Summer Olympics. He saved two games and threw 3 scoreless innings in the 2007 World Port Tournament. van Kampen had a 1-1, 9.00 record in the 2007 Baseball World Cup. He blew a save in a 4-3 loss to the Australian national team. Entering in the bottom of the 9th with a 3-2 lead, Van Kampen walked Brad Harman. Gavin Fingleson reached on a Michael Duursma error, Harman taking third. Luke Hughes hit a sacrifice fly to score Harman and Trent Oeltjen hit a game-winning double for the Aussies. In the quarterfinals, Van Kampen did far better, getting the win over the host Chinese Taipei national team with a scoreless 10th. He allowed one run in the 11th after the Netherlands scored four in the top of the frame.

Van Kampen struggled in the 2008 European Cup in Grosseto as the worst pitcher on Kinheim, which won the title. He nearly blew a 4-0 lead against the Marlins Puerto Cruz in the opener, giving up 3 runs. Against Montepaschi Grosseto in the gold medal game, he gave up a run in the 10th but got reprieve when Kinheim rallied to win.

External links
Van Kampen's profile at honkbalsite.com

References

1976 births
Living people
2006 World Baseball Classic players
2009 World Baseball Classic players
Baseball players at the 2008 Summer Olympics
Dutch expatriate baseball players in the United States
Olympic baseball players of the Netherlands
Sportspeople from Haarlem
Corendon Kinheim players